The Other Coast is a Canadian comic strip, drawn by Adrian Raeside. It has been syndicated by the Creator's Syndicate since 2001. It is syndicated to more than 150 newspapers worldwide. The strip blends environmental, political, and animal rights issues with comedy.

Collections
 The Other Coast: Road Rage in Beverly Hills (2004); 
 This Is Your First Rock Garden, Isn't It?: An Other Coast Collection (2005);

External links
 The Other Coast at Creators.com

Canadian comic strips
2001 comics debuts
Satirical comics
Comics about politics
Gag-a-day comics

The second sentence should read: It has been syndicated by Creators Syndicate since 2001.